Theloderma bicolor is a species of frog in the family Rhacophoridae, sometimes known with common name Chapa bug-eyed frog. It is found in northwestern Vietnam from the Quang Tri Province northwards and in central and southeastern Yunnan (China). Its natural habitats are subtropical or tropical moist montane forests. It is threatened by habitat loss.

References

bicolor
Frogs of China
Amphibians of Vietnam
Taxonomy articles created by Polbot
Amphibians described in 1937
Taxa named by René Léon Bourret